John Klingel (born December 21, 1963) is a former American football defensive end. He played for the Philadelphia Eagles from 1987 to 1988.

References

1963 births
Living people
American football defensive ends
Eastern Kentucky Colonels football players
Philadelphia Eagles players